Khouya is a 2010 film.

Synopsis
Within the anonymity of a normal Algerian home, Yamina, Nabila and Imen are regularly beaten by their brother, Tarek. Their mother, a witness to their brother's violent behavior, does nothing to end the drama suffered by her daughters. Khouya is the story of a drama that takes place behind closed doors and that will soon evolve into a tragedy. After Khti (My Sister), Kouya (My Brother) is the second part of the trilogy "Algerian women" created by Yanis Koussim.

Awards
 Locarno 2010
 Amiens 2010

External links

 

2010 films
Algerian short films
French short films
2010s French films